Herbert Earl "Bert" Hall  (October 15, 1889 – July 11, 1948) was a Major League Baseball pitcher.

Is thought to have thrown the first "Forkball" that is unique to the one we know today.  Placing the ball between the pointer and middle finger and throwing with a normal release, however once released, acted without rotation, much like a knuckler.  It is believed it looked a lot like former Major Leaguer Robert Coello's forkball. He hanged himself in his home on July 18, 1948.

References

External links

Baseball players from Portland, Oregon
Major League Baseball pitchers
Philadelphia Phillies players
Tacoma Tigers players
Vancouver Beavers players
Salt Lake City Bees players
Great Falls Electrics players
1889 births
1948 suicides
Suicides by hanging in Washington (state)